Naiyya is 1979 Hindi language drama movie directed by Prashanta Nanda and starring Prashanta Nanda himself and Zarina Wahab.

Naiyya is a remake of the successful Odia language movie Shesha Shrabana. The Odia movie is also directed by Prashanta Nanda, and starring himself and Mahaswata Roy.

Plot 

The film also has a very melodious song "O Goriya Re", sung by Yesudas, with music composed by Ravindra Jain.

Cast
 Prashanta Nanda as Sonu
 Baldev Khosa as Heera
 Zarina Wahab as Geeta
 Leela Mishra as Sonu's mother
 Dinesh Hingoo as Pannalal's assistant
 Amrish Puri as Pannalal
 Mohammad Mohsin as Kassim

Songs
Ravindra Jain composed songs for this film.
 "O Goriya Re" - Yesudas 
 "Beparwaa Bedardi" - Hemlata
 "Oonchi Neechi Lehron Ke" - Yesudas, Chorus
 "Mera Joban Bandha Rupaiya" - Hemlata
 "Geeta Raani" - Yesudas, Suresh Wadkar

References

1979 films
1970s Hindi-language films
Rajshri Productions films

Hindi remakes of Odia films
Films directed by Prashanta Nanda
Indian drama films